WXHC (101.5 FM, "X101") is a radio station broadcasting a classic hits format. Licensed to Homer, New York, United States, the station is owned by Eves Broadcasting, Inc. and features programming from ABC News Radio, Premiere Networks, and United Stations Radio Networks.

References

External links

XHC
Radio stations established in 1991
1991 establishments in New York (state)
Classic hits radio stations in the United States